Robert J. Skinner is a United States Air Force lieutenant general currently serving as the Director of Defense Information Systems Agency. Before, he directed Command, Control, Communications, and Cyber of the United States Indo-Pacific Command. Prior to that, he was the commander of the Twenty-Fourth Air Force. He was promoted to lieutenant general and appointed as the director of the Defense Information Systems Agency in 2021, replacing Vice Admiral Nancy A. Norton.

Awards and decorations

Effective dates of promotions

References

Year of birth missing (living people)
Living people
Place of birth missing (living people)
Park University alumni
Oklahoma City University alumni
United States Air Force generals
Lieutenant generals